He lücht (low German he is lying) is an expression used in Hamburg, Germany, for tour guides in port of Hamburg.

Overview
The first HADAG harbour tours started in 1921. The tour guides often told anecdotes and stories. When the boats came close to workers in the harbour, they would denounce the tour guides by saying "he lücht" (he lies). 

The call changed into a name for the whole profession mid of the 20th century. The first written source is the Hamburg dictionary of 1956.

References

External links 
 Jörn Hinrich Laue: Hamburger Port tour (German)

Further reading 
 Daniel Tilgner: Kleines Lexikon Hamburger Begriffe. 6 Auflage, Ellert & Richter Verlag, Hamburg 2004, S. 66–67.
 He lücht! — Tühnkram im Hafen., Hamburger Abendblatt, 25 June 2002.

Hoaxes in Germany
Culture in Hamburg
Tourism in Hamburg